Elemér Takács (born 1889, date of death unknown) was a Hungarian sports shooter. He competed in eight events at the 1924 Summer Olympics.

References

External links
 

1889 births
Year of death missing
Hungarian male sport shooters
Olympic shooters of Hungary
Shooters at the 1924 Summer Olympics
Place of birth missing